Compulsion!!!!! is a studio album by American jazz pianist Andrew Hill. It was originally released in 1967 under the Blue Note Label as BST 84217. In its album review, Billboard wrote of Compulsion!!!!!, "The wild, yet disciplined piano of Andre Hill is the driving force behind this strange and moving record." It was remastered by Rudy Van Gelder in 2006. Featured musicians include trumpeter Freddie Hubbard, tenor saxophonist John Gilmore, bassist Cecil McBee and drummer Joe Chambers.

Background and album concept 
Hill's intention was to "...construct an album expressing the legacy of the Negro tradition," and to use the piano more as a percussive instrument than a melodic one. The second number, "Legacy", was dedicated to the Afro-American legacy, and is followed by "Premonition", which Hill described as " indicating not alone a look ahead, but rather a sufficiently revealing look backward, so that you can really begin to know what may come." The album concludes with "Limbo", a 20-bar tune, a piece written to represent the state in which Hill considered the majority of Afro-Americans to be in at the time, not drawing on their heritage.

Track listing 
All compositions by Andrew Hill
 "Compulsion" – 14:15
 "Legacy" – 5:50
 "Premonition" – 10:32
 "Limbo" – 10:17

Personnel 
 Andrew Hill – piano
 Freddie Hubbard – trumpet, flugelhorn (Except track 2)
 John Gilmore – tenor saxophone, bass clarinet (Except track 2)
 Cecil McBee – bass
 Joe Chambers – drums
 Renaud Simmons – conga, percussion
 Nadi Qamar – percussion, African drums, thumb piano
 Richard Davis – bass (track 3)

References

Sources 
 Compulsion page at Blue Note website

1967 albums
Andrew Hill albums
Blue Note Records albums
Albums produced by Alfred Lion
Albums recorded at Van Gelder Studio